Brandon Ludwig (born September 30, 1990) is a Canadian actor. He achieved international recognition for portraying a promiscuous and dim-witted but good-natured room mate on the tv show Gamer's Paradise. His persona on the show was considered a "ladies' man," with a marked childish side.

Early life 
Ludwig was born and raised in Kitchener, Ontario. He graduated from the University of Waterloo. His early acting education came from the Second City School in Toronto where he moved after university to pursue his acting career.

Career 
Ludwig had his first role in a Canadian film in 2007 with his brother Sheldon Ludwig. He went on to book over 100 different jobs in his career before he was able to get into television. Sheldon went on to create a film/TV production company, Don Shal Productions. Brandon on the other hand, acted in various roles in film and television such as: A Fighting Man, My Babysitter's a Vampire, Man Seeking Woman. Ludwig's most notable achievement came when he contributed to Joseph Gordon-Levitt's HitRecord on TV television show where they won an Emmy Award for Outstanding Creative Achievement in Interactive Media - Social TV Experience; Joseph shared the Emmy with his contributors. Brandon and Sheldon partner together in the industry and are known as the Ludwig Bros. Ludwig is directing Canadian Star which is a documentary about bringing to light the subject of name recognition in Canada; the documentary will be released in 2016. Ludwig's next project will be The Dunner (movie working title) with Sanctuary sci-fi star Robin Dunne with his brother and Dave Roberts.

Since 2020, Ludwig has been a regular on the podcast Beam Me Up Scotty, created and hosted by his friend Kenny Scott Guffey.

Filmography 

2022
A Night of the Undead

References

Living people
Canadian male television actors
University of Waterloo alumni
Canadian male film actors
Male actors from Kitchener, Ontario
1990 births